The 1966–67 Cypriot First Division was the 28th season of the Cypriot top-level football league.

Overview
It was contested by 12 teams, and Olympiakos Nicosia won the championship.

League standings

Results

References
Cyprus - List of final tables (RSSSF)

Cypriot First Division seasons
Cypriot
1